This is the complete discography of Rephlex Records.

References

External links
 Official site

 
Discographies of British record labels